HECT domain and ankyrin repeat containing E3 ubiquitin protein ligase 1 is a protein that in humans is encoded by the HACE1 gene.

Function

This gene encodes a HECT domain and ankyrin repeat-containing ubiquitin ligase. The encoded protein is involved in specific tagging of target proteins, leading to their subcellular localization or proteasomal degradation. The protein is a potential tumor suppressor and is involved in the pathophysiology of several tumors, including Wilm's tumor. [provided by RefSeq, Mar 2016].

References

Further reading